Francis Bacon (28 October 1909 – 28 April 1992) was an Irish-born British figurative painter known for his raw, unsettling imagery. Focusing on the human form, his subjects included crucifixions, portraits of popes, self-portraits, and portraits of close friends, with abstracted figures sometimes isolated in geometrical structures. Rejecting various classifications of his work, Bacon said he strove to render "the brutality of fact." He built up a reputation as one of the giants of contemporary art with his unique style.

Bacon said that he saw images "in series", and his work, which numbers in the region of 590 extant paintings along with many others he destroyed, typically focused on a single subject for sustained periods, often in triptych or diptych formats. His output can be broadly described as sequences or variations on single motifs; including the 1930s Picasso-influenced bio-morphs and Furies, the 1940s male heads isolated in rooms or geometric structures, the 1950s "screaming popes," the mid-to-late 1950s animals and lone figures, the early 1960s crucifixions, the mid-to-late 1960s portraits of friends, the 1970s self-portraits, and the cooler, more technical 1980s paintings.

Bacon did not begin to paint until his late twenties, having drifted in the late 1920s and early 1930s as an interior decorator, bon vivant and gambler. He said that his artistic career was delayed because he spent too long looking for subject matter that could sustain his interest. His breakthrough came with the 1944 triptych Three Studies for Figures at the Base of a Crucifixion, which sealed his reputation as a uniquely bleak chronicler of the human condition. From the mid-1960s he mainly produced portraits of friends and drinking companions, either as single, diptych or triptych panels. Following the suicide of his lover George Dyer in 1971 (memorialised in his Black Triptychs, and a number of posthumous portraits) his art became more sombre, inward-looking and preoccupied with the passage of time and death. The climax of his later period is marked by the masterpieces Study for Self-Portrait (1982)  and Study for a Self-Portrait—Triptych, 1985–86.

Despite his existentialist and bleak outlook, Bacon was charismatic, articulate and well-read. A bon vivant, he spent his middle age eating, drinking and gambling in London's Soho with like-minded friends including Lucian Freud (although they fell out in the mid-1970s, for reasons neither ever explained), John Deakin, Muriel Belcher, Henrietta Moraes, Daniel Farson, Tom Baker and Jeffrey Bernard. After Dyer's suicide he largely distanced himself from this circle, and while still socially active and his passion for gambling and drinking continued, he settled into a platonic and somewhat fatherly relationship with his eventual heir, John Edwards.

Since his death, Bacon's reputation has grown steadily, and his work is among the most acclaimed, expensive and sought-after on the art market. In the late 1990s a number of major works, previously assumed destroyed, including early 1950s pope paintings and 1960s portraits, re-emerged to set record prices at auction.

Biography

Early life
Francis Bacon was born on 28 October 1909 in 63 Lower Baggot Street, Dublin, Ireland. At that time, all of Ireland was still part of the United Kingdom. His father, army Captain Anthony Edward Mortimer Bacon, known as Eddy, was born in Adelaide, South Australia, to an English father and an Australian mother. Eddy was a veteran of the Boer War, a racehorse trainer, and grandson of Major-General Anthony Bacon, who claimed descent from Sir Nicholas Bacon, elder half-brother of The 1st Viscount St Albans (better known to history as Sir Francis Bacon), the Elizabethan statesman, philosopher and essayist. Bacon's mother, Christina Winifred Firth, known as Winnie, was heiress to a Sheffield steel business and coal mine. Bacon had an older brother, Harley, two younger sisters, Ianthe and Winifred, and a younger brother, Edward. Bacon was raised by the family nanny, Jessie Lightfoot, from Cornwall, known as "Nanny Lightfoot", a maternal figure who remained close to him until her death. During the early 1940s, he rented the ground floor of 7 Cromwell Place, South Kensington, John Everett Millais's old studio, and Nanny Lightfoot helped him install an illicit roulette wheel there, organised by Bacon and his friends.

The family moved house often, moving between Ireland and England several times, leading to a sense of displacement which remained with Bacon throughout his life. The family lived in Cannycourt House in County Kildare from 1911, later moving to Westbourne Terrace in London, close to where Bacon's father worked at the Territorial Force Records Office. They returned to Ireland after the First World War. Bacon lived with his maternal grandmother and step-grandfather, Winifred and Kerry Supple, at Farmleigh, Abbeyleix, County Laois, although the rest of the family again moved to Straffan Lodge near Naas, County Kildare.

Bacon was shy as a child, and enjoyed dressing up. This, and his effeminate manner, angered his father. A story emerged in 1992 of his father having had Bacon horsewhipped by their grooms. 

In 1924, shortly after the establishment of the Irish Free State, his parents moved to Gloucestershire, first to Prescott House in Gotherington, then Linton Hall near the border with Herefordshire. At a fancy-dress party at the Firth family home, Cavendish Hall in Suffolk, Bacon dressed as a flapper with an Eton crop, beaded dress, lipstick, high heels, and a long cigarette holder. In 1926, the family moved back to Straffan Lodge. His sister, Ianthe, twelve years his junior, recalled that Bacon made drawings of ladies with cloche hats and long cigarette holders. Later that year, Bacon was thrown out of Straffan Lodge following an incident in which his father found him admiring himself in front of a large mirror wearing his mother's underwear.

London, Berlin and Paris
Bacon spent the latter half of 1926 in London, on an allowance of £3 a week from his mother's trust fund, reading Nietzsche. Although poor (£5 was then the average weekly wage), Bacon found that by avoiding rent and engaging in petty theft, he could survive. To supplement his income, he briefly tried his hand at domestic service, but although he enjoyed cooking, he became bored and resigned. He was sacked from a telephone-answering position at a shop selling women's clothes in Poland Street, Soho, after writing a poison pen letter to the owner. Bacon found himself drifting through London's homosexual underworld, aware that he was able to attract a certain type of rich man, something he was quick to take advantage of, having developed a taste for good food and wine. One was a relative of Winnie Harcourt-Smith, another breeder of racehorses, who was renowned for his manliness. Bacon claimed his father had asked this "uncle" to take him 'in-hand' and 'make a man of him'. Bacon had a difficult relationship with his father, once admitting to being sexually attracted to him.

In 1927 Bacon moved to Berlin, where he first saw Fritz Lang's Metropolis and Sergei Eisenstein's Battleship Potemkin, both later to be influences on his work. He spent two months in Berlin, though Harcourt-Smith left after one – "He soon got tired of me, of course, and went off with a woman ... I didn't really know what to do, so I hung on for a while." Bacon then spent the next year-and-a-half in Paris. He met Yvonne Bocquentin, pianist and connoisseur, at the opening of an exhibition. Aware of his own need to learn French, Bacon lived for three months with Madame Bocquentin and her family at their house near Chantilly. He travelled into Paris to visit the city's art galleries. At the Château de Chantilly (Musée Condé) he saw Nicolas Poussin's Massacre of the Innocents, a painting which he often referred to in his later work.

Return to London
Bacon moved to London in the winter of 1928/29, to work as an interior designer. He took a studio at 17 Queensberry Mews West, South Kensington, sharing the upper floor with Eric Allden – his first collector – and his childhood nanny, Jessie Lightfoot. In 1929, he met Eric Hall, his patron and lover in an often torturous and abusive relationship. Bacon left the Queensberry Mews West studio in 1931 and had no settled space for some years. He probably shared a studio with Roy De Maistre, circa 1931/32 in Chelsea.

Furniture and rugs
The 1933 Crucifixion was his first painting to attract public attention, and was in part based on Pablo Picasso's The Three Dancers of 1925. It was not well received; disillusioned, he abandoned painting for nearly a decade, and suppressed his earlier works. He visited Paris in 1935 where he bought a secondhand book on anatomical diseases of the mouth containing high quality hand-coloured plates of both open mouths and oral interiors, which haunted and obsessed him for the remainder of his life. These and the scene with the nurse screaming on the Odessa steps  from the Battleship Potemkin later became recurrent parts of Bacon's iconography, with the angularity of Eisenstein's images often combined with the thick red palette of his recently purchased medical tome.

In the winter of 1935–36, Roland Penrose and Herbert Read, making a first selection for the International Surrealist Exhibition, visited his studio at 71 Royal Hospital Road, Chelsea saw "three or four large canvases including one with a grandfather clock", but found his work "insufficiently surreal to be included in the show". Bacon claimed Penrose told him "Mr. Bacon, don't you realise a lot has happened in painting since the Impressionists?" In 1936 or 1937 Bacon moved from 71 Royal Hospital Road to the top floor of 1 Glebe Place, Chelsea, which Eric Hall had rented. The following year, Patrick White moved to the top two floors of the building where De Maistre had his studio, on Eccleston Street and commissioned from Bacon, by now a friend, a writing desk (with wide drawers and a red linoleum top). Expressing one of his basic concerns from the late 1930s, Bacon said that his artistic career was delayed because he spent too long looking for subject matter that could sustain his interest.

In January 1937, at Thomas Agnew and Sons, 43 Old Bond Street, London, Bacon exhibited in a group show, Young British Painters, which included Graham Sutherland and Roy De Maistre. Eric Hall organised the show. He showed four works: Figures in a Garden (1936); Abstraction,  Abstraction from the Human Form (known from magazine photographs)  and Seated Figure (also lost). These paintings prefigure Three Studies for Figures at the Base of a Crucifixion (1944) in alternatively representing a tripod structure (Abstraction), bared teeth (Abstraction from the Human Form), and both being biomorphic in form. 

On 1 June 1940, Bacon's father died. Bacon was named sole Trustee/Executor of his father's will, which requested the funeral be as "private and simple as possible". Unfit for active wartime service, Bacon volunteered for civil defence and worked full-time in the Air Raid Precautions (ARP) rescue service; the fine dust of bombed London worsened his asthma and he was discharged. At the height of the Blitz, Eric Hall rented a cottage for Bacon and himself at Bedales Lodge in Steep, near Petersfield, Hampshire. Figure Getting Out of a Car (ca. 1939/1940) was painted here but is known only from an early 1946 photograph taken by Peter Rose Pulham. The photograph was taken shortly before the canvas was painted over by Bacon and retitled Landscape with Car. An ancestor to the biomorphic form of the central panel of Three Studies for Figures at the Base of a Crucifixion (1944), the composition was suggested by a photograph of Hitler getting out of a car at one of the Nuremberg rallies. Bacon claims to have "copied the car and not much else".

Bacon and Hall in 1943 took the ground floor of 7 Cromwell Place, South Kensington, formerly the house and studio of John Everett Millais. High-vaulted and north-lit, its roof was recently bombed – Bacon was able to adapt a large old billiard room at the back as his studio. Lightfoot, lacking an alternative location, slept on the kitchen table. They held illicit roulette parties, organised by Bacon with the assistance of Hall.

Early success

By 1944 Bacon had gained confidence and moved toward developing his unique signature style. His Three Studies for Figures at the Base of a Crucifixion had summarised themes explored in his earlier paintings, including his examination of Picasso's biomorphs, his interpretations of the Crucifixion, and the Greek Furies. It is generally considered his first mature piece; he regarded his works before the triptych as irrelevant. The painting caused a sensation when exhibited in 1945 and established him as a foremost post-war painter. Remarking on the cultural significance of Three Studies, John Russell observed in 1971 that "there was painting in England before the Three Studies, and painting after them, and no one ... can confuse the two."

Painting (1946) was shown in several group shows including in the British section of Exposition internationale d'art moderne (18 November – 28 December 1946) at the Musée National d'Art Moderne, for which Bacon travelled to Paris. Within a fortnight of the sale of Painting (1946) to the Hanover Gallery Bacon used the proceeds to decamp from London to Monte Carlo. After staying at a succession of hotels and flats, including the Hôtel de Ré, Bacon settled in a large villa, La Frontalière, in the hills above the town. Hall and Lightfoot would come to stay. Bacon spent much of the next few years in Monte Carlo apart from short visits to London. From Monte Carlo, Bacon wrote to Sutherland and Erica Brausen. His letters to Brausen show he painted there, but no paintings are known to survive. Bacon said he became "obsessed" with the Casino de Monte Carlo, where he would "spend whole days". Falling in debt from gambling here, he was unable to afford a new canvas. This compelled him to paint on the raw, unprimed side of his previous work, a practice he kept throughout his life.

In 1948, Painting (1946) sold to Alfred Barr for the Museum of Modern Art (MoMA) in New York for £240. Bacon wrote to Sutherland asking that he apply fixative to the patches of pastel on Painting (1946) before it was shipped to New York. (The work is now too fragile to be moved from MoMA for exhibition elsewhere.) At least one visit to Paris in 1946 brought Bacon into more immediate contact with French postwar painting and with Left Bank ideas such as Existentialism. He had, by this time, embarked on his lifelong friendship with Isabel Rawsthorne, a painter closely involved with Giacometti and the Left Bank set. They shared many interests, including ethnography and classical literature.

Late 1940s
In 1947, Sutherland introduced Bacon to Brausen, who represented Bacon for twelve years. Despite this, Bacon did not mount a one-man show in Brausen's Hanover Gallery until 1949. Bacon returned to London and Cromwell Place late in 1948.

The following year Bacon exhibited his "Heads" series, most notable for Head VI, Bacon's first surviving engagement with Velázquez's Portrait of Pope Innocent X (three 'popes' were painted in Monte Carlo in 1946 but were destroyed). He kept an extensive inventory of images for source material, but preferred not to confront the major works in person; he viewed Portrait of Innocent X only once, much later in his life.

1950s

Bacon's main haunt was The Colony Room, a private drinking club at 41 Dean Street in Soho, known as "Muriel's" after Muriel Belcher, its proprietor. Belcher had run the Music-box club in Leicester Square during the war, and secured a 3 – 11pm drinking licence for the Colony Room bar as a private-members club. Bacon was an early member, joining the day after its opening in 1948. He was 'adopted' by Belcher as a 'daughter', and allowed free drinks and £10 a week to bring in friends and rich patrons. In 1948 he met John Minton, a regular at Muriel's, as were the painters Lucian Freud, Frank Auerbach, Patrick Swift and the Vogue photographer John Deakin.

In 1950, Bacon met the art critic David Sylvester, then best known for his writing on Henry Moore and Alberto Giacometti. Sylvester had admired and written about Bacon since 1948. Bacon's artistic inclinations in the 1950s moved towards his abstracted figures which were typically isolated in geometrical cage-like spaces, and set against flat, nondescript backgrounds. Bacon said that he saw images "in series", and his work typically focused more on a single subject for sustained periods, often in triptych or diptych formats. Although his decisions might have been driven by the fact that in the 1950s he tended to produce group works for specific showings, usually leaving things until the last minute, there is significant development in his aesthetic choices during this period which influenced his preference for the represented content in his paintings.

Bacon was impressed by Goya, African landscapes and wildlife, and took photographs in Kruger National Park. On his return journey he spent a few days in Cairo, and wrote to Erica Brausen of his intent to visit Karnak and Luxor, and then travel via Alexandria to Marseilles. The visit confirmed his belief in the supremacy of Egyptian art, embodied by the Sphinx. He returned in early 1951.

On 30 April 1951, Jessie Lightfoot, his childhood nanny, died at Cromwell Place; Bacon was gambling in Nice when he learned of her death. She had been his closest companion, joining him in London on his return from Paris, and lived with him and Eric Alden at Queensberry Mews West, and later with Eric Hall near Petersfield, in Monte Carlo and at Cromwell Place. Stricken, Bacon sold the 7 Cromwell Place apartment.

In 1958 he aligned with the Marlborough Fine Art gallery, who remained as his sole dealer until 1992. In return for  a 10-year contract, Marlborough advanced him money against current and future paintings, with the price of each determined by its size. A painting measuring 20 inches by 24 inches was valued at £165 ($462), while one of 65 inches by 78 inches was valued at £420 ($1,176); these were sizes Bacon favoured. According to the contract, the painter would try to supply the gallery with £3,500 ($9,800) worth of pictures each year.

1960s and 1970s

Bacon met George Dyer in 1963 at a pub, although a much-repeated myth claims they met when Dyer burgled Bacon's flat. Dyer was about 30 years old, from London's East End. He came from a family steeped in crime, and had till then spent his life drifting between theft and prison. Bacon's earlier relationships had been with older and tumultuous men. His first lover, Peter Lacy, tore up Bacon's paintings, beat him in drunken rages, at times leaving him on streets half-conscious. Bacon was now the dominating personality, attracted to Dyer's vulnerability and trusting nature. Dyer was impressed by Bacon's self-confidence and success, and Bacon acted as a protector and father figure to the insecure younger man.

Dyer was, like Bacon, a borderline alcoholic and similarly took obsessive care with his appearance. Pale-faced and a chain-smoker, Dyer typically confronted his daily hangovers by drinking again. His compact and athletic build belied a docile and inwardly tortured personality, although the art critic Michael Peppiatt describes him as having the air of a man who could "land a decisive punch". Their behaviours eventually overwhelmed their affair, and by 1970 Bacon was merely providing Dyer with enough money to stay more or less permanently drunk.

As Bacon's work moved from the extreme subject matter of his early paintings to portraits of friends in the mid-1960s, Dyer became a dominating presence. Bacon's paintings emphasise Dyer's physicality, yet are uncharacteristically tender. More than any other of Bacon's close friends, Dyer came to feel inseparable from his portraits. The paintings gave him stature, a raison d'etre, and offered meaning to what Bacon described as Dyer's "brief interlude between life and death". Many critics have described Dyer's portraits as favourites, including Michel Leiris and Lawrence Gowing. Yet as Dyer's novelty diminished within Bacon's circle of sophisticated intellectuals, Dyer became increasingly bitter and ill at ease. Although Dyer welcomed the attention the paintings brought him, he did not pretend to understand or even like them. "All that money an' I fink they're reely 'orrible," he observed with choked pride.

Dyer abandoned crime but descended into alcoholism. Bacon's money attracted hangers-on for benders around London's Soho. Withdrawn and reserved when sober, Dyer was highly animated and aggressive when drunk, and often attempted to "pull a Bacon" by buying large rounds and paying for expensive dinners for his wide circle. Dyer's erratic behaviour inevitably wore thin with his cronies, with Bacon, and with Bacon's friends. Most of Bacon's art world associates regarded Dyer as a nuisance – an intrusion into the world of high culture to which their Bacon belonged. Dyer reacted by becoming increasingly needy and dependent. By 1971, he was drinking alone and only in occasional contact with his former lover.

In October 1971, Dyer joined Bacon in Paris for the opening of Bacon's retrospective at the Grand Palais. The show was the high point of Bacon's career to date, and he was now described as Britain's "greatest living painter". Dyer was a desperate man, and although he was "allowed" to attend, he was well aware that he was slipping out of the picture. To draw Bacon's attention, he planted cannabis in his flat and phoned the police, and attempted suicide on a number of occasions. On the eve of the Paris exhibition, Bacon and Dyer shared a hotel room, but Bacon was forced to escape in disgust to the room of gallery employee Terry Danziger-Miles, as Dyer was entertaining an Arab rent boy with "smelly feet". When Bacon returned to his room the next morning, 24 October, together with Danziger-Miles and Valerie Beston, they discovered Dyer in the bathroom dead, seated on the toilet. With the agreement of the hotel manager, the party agreed not to announce the death for two days.

Bacon spent the following day surrounded by people eager to meet him. In mid-evening of the following day he was "informed" that Dyer had taken an overdose of barbiturates and was dead. Bacon continued with the retrospective and displayed powers of self-control "to which few of us could aspire", according to Russell. Bacon was deeply affected by the loss of Dyer, and had recently lost four other friends and his nanny. From this point, death haunted his life and work. Though outwardly stoic at the time, he was inwardly broken. He did not express his feelings to critics, but later admitted to friends that "daemons, disaster and loss" now stalked him as if his own version of the Eumenides (Greek for The Furies). Bacon spent the remainder of his stay in Paris attending to promotional activities and funeral arrangements. He returned to London later that week to comfort Dyer's family.

During the funeral many of Dyer's friends, including hardened East-End criminals, broke down in tears. As the coffin was lowered into the grave one friend was overcome and screamed "you bloody fool!" Bacon remained stoic during the proceedings, but in the following months suffered an emotional and physical breakdown. Deeply affected, over the following two years he painted a number of single canvas portraits of Dyer, and the three highly regarded "Black Triptychs", each of which details moments immediately before and after Dyer's suicide.

Death
While on holiday, Bacon was admitted to the private Clinica Ruber, Madrid in 1992, where he was cared for by the Handmaids of Maria. His chronic asthma, which had plagued him all his life, had developed into a more severe respiratory condition and he could not talk or breathe very well.

He died of a heart attack on 28 April 1992. He bequeathed his estate (then valued at £11 million) to his heir and sole legatee John Edwards; in 1998, at Edwards' request, Brian Clarke, a friend of Bacon and Edwards, was installed as sole executor of the estate by the High Court, following the Court's severing of all ties between Bacon's former gallery, Marlborough Fine Art, and his estate. In 1998 the director of the Hugh Lane Gallery in Dublin secured Edwards' and Clarke's donation of the contents of Bacon's studio at 7 Reece Mews, South Kensington. The contents of his studio were surveyed, moved, and reconstructed in the gallery.

Themes

The Crucifixion
The imagery of the crucifixion weighs heavily in the work of Francis Bacon. Critic John Russell wrote that the crucifixion in Bacon's work is a "generic name for an environment in which bodily harm is done to one or more persons and one or more other persons gather to watch". Bacon admitted that he saw the scene as "a magnificent armature on which you can hang all types of feeling and sensation". He believed the imagery of the crucifixion allowed him to examine "certain areas of human behaviour" in a unique way, as the armature of the theme had been accumulated by so many old masters.

Though he came to painting relatively late in life – he did not begin to paint seriously until his late 30s – crucifixion scenes can be found in his earliest works. In 1933, his patron Eric Hall commissioned a series of three paintings based on the subject. The early paintings were influenced by such old masters as Matthias Grünewald, Diego Velázquez and Rembrandt, but also by Picasso's late 1920s/early 1930s biomorphs and the early work of the Surrealists.

Popes
Bacon's series of Popes, largely quoting Velázquez's famous portrait of Pope Innocent X (1650, Galeria Doria Pamphili, Rome) are striking images which further develop motifs already found in his earlier works, like the Study for Three Figures at the Base of a Crucifixion, such as the screaming open mouth. The figures of the popes, pictorially isolated by partly curved parallel lines indicating psychological forces and symbolising inner energy like strength of feeling, are alienated from their original representation and, stripped of their representation of power to allegories of suffering humanity.

Reclining figures
Many of Bacon's paintings are "inhabited" by reclining figures. Single, or, as in triptychs, repeated with variations, they can be commented by symbolic indexes (like circular arrows as signs for rotation), turning painted images to blueprints for moving images of the type of contemporary GIFs. The composition of especially the nude figures is influenced by the sculptural work of Michelangelo. The multi-phasing of his rendition of the figures, which often is also applied to the sitters in the portraits, is also a reference to Eadweard Muybridge's chronophotography.

The screaming mouth

The inspiration for the recurring motif of screaming mouths in many Bacons of the late 1940s and early 1950s was drawn from a number of sources, including medical text books, the works of Matthias Grünewald and photographic stills of the nurse in the Odessa Steps scene in Eisenstein's 1925 silent film Battleship Potemkin. Bacon saw the film in 1935, and viewed it frequently thereafter. He kept in his studio a photographic still of the scene, showing a close-up of the nurse's head screaming in panic and terror and with broken pince-nez spectacles hanging from her blood-stained face. He referred to the image throughout his career, using it as a source of inspiration.

Bacon described the screaming mouth as a catalyst for his work, and incorporated its shape when painting the chimera. His use of the motif can be seen in one of his first surviving works, Abstraction from the Human Form. By the early 1950s it became an obsessive concern, to the point, according to art critic and Bacon biographer Michael Peppiatt, "it would be no exaggeration to say that, if one could really explain the origins and implications of this scream, one would be far closer to understanding the whole art of Francis Bacon."

Legacy

Estate assignment
In 1999, England's High Court ruled that Marlborough Fine Art had to be replaced by a new independent representative for the Bacon estate. The estate moved its business to Faggionato Fine Arts in Europe and Tony Shafrazi in New York. That same year, the estate sued Marlborough UK and Marlborough International, Vaduz, charging them with wrongfully exploiting Bacon in a relationship that was manifestly disadvantageous to him, until his death in 1992, and to his estate.  The suit alleged Marlborough in London grossly underpaid Bacon for his works and resold them through its Liechtenstein branch at much higher prices, contending that Marlborough never supplied a complete accounting of Bacon's works, and failed to account for up to 33 of his paintings. The litigation was settled out of court in early 2002, following Edwards' diagnosis of lung cancer, with both sides paying their own costs. During the legal process, an undisclosed number of Bacon's paintings were recovered from Marlborough, and "vast quantities of correspondence and documents relating to Bacon's life were handed over by the gallery". In 2003, the estate was handed to a four-person trust based in Jersey.

Francis Bacon studio

In August 1998, Bacon's sole heir John Edwards and the artist Brian Clarke, sole executor of Bacon's estate, donated the contents of Bacon's studio to the Hugh Lane Gallery in Dublin. The studio at 7 Reece Mews had remained largely untouched since Bacon's death in 1992, and the decision was taken to preserve it for posterity. A team of archaeologists, art historians, conservators and curators oversaw the wholesale relocation of the studio to Dublin. The locations of over 7,000 items were mapped, survey and elevation drawings made, the items packed and catalogued, and the studio was rebuilt, including the original doors, floor, walls and ceiling.  At the time, Edwards commented about the decision to send the entire studio to Ireland: "a little corner of South Kensington moved to his birthplace. Thousands of papers, books, photos, rotted curtains – all in Dublin. I think it would have made him roar with laughter...".  In 2001 the relocated studio was opened to the public, with a fully comprehensive database, the first computerised record of the entire contents of an artist's studio. Every item in the studio has a database entry. Each entry consists of an image and a factual account of an object. The database has entries on approximately 570 books and catalogues, 1,500 photographs, 100 slashed canvases, 1,300 leaves torn from books, 2,000 artist's materials and 70 drawings. Other categories include Bacon's correspondence, magazines, newspapers and vinyl records.

In an interview to BBC News, when the decision to move Bacon's London Studio to Ireland was announced, Clarke commented the following about all controversies over the donation of the studio: "Bacon once said that he'd never come back to Dublin until he was dead, (...) I think frankly if he were here today to see what happened, I think he'd be touched but I think he'd probably roar with laughter as well". To The Irish Times he also commented about the Bacon's Studio removal to Ireland: "And it's very appropriate. I'm convinced Francis would have loved it. After all, he was born here, and he said once that he couldn't come back until he was dead – the fuss would be too much."

Auction value
The Popes and large triptychs, in their time, commanded the highest prices at auction. By 1989 Bacon was the most expensive living artist after one of his triptychs sold at Sotheby's for over $6 million. In 2007, actress Sophia Loren consigned Study for Portrait II (1956) from the estate of her late husband Carlo Ponti at Christie's. It was auctioned for the then record price of £14.2 million ($27.5 million).

In 2008, the Triptych, 1976, sold at Sotheby's for €55.465 million ($86.28 million), then a record for a work by Bacon and the highest price paid for a postwar work of art at auction up to 2008. In 2013, Three Studies of Lucian Freud sold at Christie's New York for $142.4 million, surpassing both Triptych and 1976 in auctioned value, and more importantly claiming the record for highest auction price of a work of art at that time, a title previously held by the fourth version of Edvard Munch's Scream and now held by Leonardo da Vinci's Salvator Mundi.

Catalogue raisonné
A first, incomplete catalogue raisonné was compiled by curator Ronald Alley in 1964. In 2016, a five-volume Francis Bacon: Catalogue Raisonné, documenting 584 paintings by Bacon, was released by Martin Harrison and others.

References

Citations

General and cited references 

 Archimbaud, Michel. Francis Bacon: The Final Vision. New York: Phaidon Press, 1994. 
 Bacon, Francis. Francis Bacon: Important Paintings from the Estate. New York: Tony Shafrazi gallery, 1998. 
 Baldassari, Anne. Bacon-Picasso: The Life of Images. London: Flammarion, 2005. 
 Brighton, Andrew. Francis Bacon. London: Tate Publishing, 2001. 
 Cappock, Margarita. Francis Bacon's Studio. London: Merrell Publishers, 2005. 
 Deleuze, Gilles. Francis Bacon: The Logic of Sensation. Paris: Continuum International Publishing- Mansell, 2004. 
 Domino, Christophe. Francis Bacon. London: Thames and Hudson, 1997. 
 Edwards, John. 7 Reece Mews: Francis Bacon's Studio. London: Thames & Hudson, 2001. 
 Farson, Daniel. The Gilded Gutter Life of Francis Bacon. London: Vintage, 1994. 
 Gale, Matthew & Sylvester David. Francis Bacon: Working on Paper London: Tate Publishing, 1999. 
 Hammer, Martin. Bacon and Sutherland. Boston: Yale University Press, 2005. 
 Hammer, Martin. Francis Bacon: Portraits and Heads. Edinburgh: National Galleries of Scotland, 2005. 
 Harrison, Martin. In Camera, Francis Bacon: Photography, Film and the Practice of Painting. Thames & Hudson, 2005. 
 Harrison, Martin; Daniels, Rebecca. Francis Bacon Incunabula. London: Thames & Hudson, 2009. 
 Kundera, Milan & Borel, France. Bacon: Portraits and Self-portraits. London: Thames & Hudson, 1996. 
 Peppiatt, Michael. Francis Bacon: Anatomy of an Enigma. London: Weidenfeld & Nicolson, 1996. 
 Peppiatt, Michael. Francis Bacon in the 1950s. London: Yale University Press, 2006. 
 Rothenstein, John (intro); Alley, Ronald. Catalogue raisonnè and documentation, 1964. Francis Bacon. Thames and Hudson
 Rump, Gerhard Charles. Francis Bacons Menschenbild. In: Gerhard Charles Rump: Kunstpsychologie, Kunst und Psycoanalyse, Kunstwissenschaft. (1981), pp. 146–168 
 Russell, John. Francis Bacon. London: Thames and Hudson, 1993. 
 Sabatier, Bruno. "The Complete Graphic Work, Catalogue Raisonné", Paris, JSC Gallery, 2012.
 Schmied, Wieland. Francis Bacon: Commitment and Conflict. London: Prestel Verlag, 2006. 
 Sinclair, Andrew Francis. Bacon: His Life and Violent Times. London, Sinclair Stevenson, 1993; New York, Crown
 Steffen, Barbara; Bryson, Norman. Francis Bacon and the Tradition of Art. Zurich: Skira Editore, 2004. 
 Stevens, Mark; Swan, Annalyn. Francis Bacon: Revelations. Knopf, 2021. 
 Sylvester, David. Interviews with Francis Bacon. London: Thames & Hudson, 1987. 
 Sylvester, David. Looking Back at Francis Bacon. London: Thames & Hudson, 2000. 
 Sylvester, David. Francis Bacon: The Human Body. London: Hayward Gallery, 1998. 
 Sylvester, David. About Modern Art: Critical Essays 1948–2000. London: Pimlico, 2002. 
 Todoli, Vincente. Francis Bacon: Caged. Uncaged. Lisbon: Fundacao De Serralves, 2003. 
 Van Alphen, Ernst. Francis Bacon and the Loss of Self. London: Reaktion Books, 1992. 
 Zweite, Armin. Francis Bacon: The Violence of the Real. London: Thames and Hudson, 2006.

External links

  – official site
 Francis Bacon image licensing at Artimage
 
 Francis Bacon in the Tate Collection
 Francis Bacon in the Guggenheim Collection
 
 Francis Bacon  at the National Gallery of Canada, Ottawa, Ontario
 Francis Bacon on the Tate Channel
 

 
1909 births
1992 deaths
20th-century British male artists
20th-century Irish painters
20th-century textile artists
Academics of the Royal College of Art
Anglo-Irish artists
Artists from Dublin (city)
English gay artists
British people of Australian descent
British textile artists
Civil Defence Service personnel
English expatriates in France
English expatriates in Morocco
English furniture designers
English interior designers
Gay painters
Irish expatriates in England
Irish furniture designers
Irish LGBT artists
Irish male painters
English LGBT painters
Modern painters
Painters from London
People educated at Dean Close School
People from County Kildare
People from South Kensington